Eastergoa (also Ostergau, Ostergo, or Oostergo) was one of the seven areas and one of the three Gaue within what is today the province of Friesland in the Netherlands.

Area  
On its west side Eastergoa was bordered by the Middelsee with Westergoa on the other side of the water. To the east it was bordered by the Lauwers, the Lauwerzee and the Westerkwartier of the Ommelanden (the western portion of the today's province of Groningen).

1200 
The whole of this area belonged to Wininge and Achtkarspelen, which was at that point still a part of Eastergoa. Around 1250 it was split into two parts called the Noardlike njoggen ('northern nine') and the Sudlike njoggen ('southern nine').

1500 
Around 1500 Eastergoa was further divided into two cities and eleven  (municipalities).

See also
 Albdag

History of Friesland
Geography of Friesland